Shri Randhir Prasad Verma, AC (1952 - 1991 ) was an Indian  police officer who was martyred while fighting off a robbery attempt at a bank in Dhanbad, Jharkhand, India. He was posthumously awarded  the gallantry award  Ashoka Chakra. The Government of India also issued a Commemorative postage stamp in his honor in 2004.

Early life

Mr. Randhir Verma was born in a Kayastha family in Jharkhand.
He has completed his graduation from Patna University.

Police career 
He single-handedly confronted a gang of terrorists armed with AK 47 automatic rifles at the Dhanbad branch of Bank of India on 3 January 1991, attempting robbery. A fierce gun battle resulted with Verma killing two of the robbers with his pistol but himself shot to death.

He was honoured with Ashoka Chakra, the highest Peacetime Award for gallantry in India.

References

Indian Police Service officers
1991 deaths
1952 births
Recipients of the Ashoka Chakra (military decoration)
Indian police officers killed in the line of duty
People murdered in Jharkhand
People from Supaul district
Ashoka Chakra